Latimer Neville, 6th Baron Braybrooke (22 April 1827 – 12 January 1904), styled the Hon. Latimer Neville until 1902, was a British peer, clergyman and academic, for half a century Master of Magdalene College, Cambridge.

Neville was the fourth son of Richard Griffin, 3rd Baron Braybrooke. He was educated at Eton College and Magdalene College, Cambridge, matriculating in 1845 aged 18, gaining a Fellowship in 1848, and graduating M.A. in 1849. He was ordained deacon in 1850 and priest in 1851.

Neville's father Lord Braybrooke was the Visitor of Magdalene College; his uncle George Neville-Grenville was the Master. In 1846 Neville-Grenville was appointed Dean of Windsor and offered to resign the Mastership; Lord Braybrooke, as Visitor, refused the resignation, intending that Latimer Neville (then aged 19) should eventually succeed him as Master. With some diplomacy needed to manage the Fellowship, this transition was achieved in 1853, and Latimer Neville became Master at the age of 26.

He served as Vice-Chancellor of the University of Cambridge 1859–61.

He held the following church livings:
 Curate of Waltham St Lawrence, 1850–51
 Rector of Heydon with Little Chishill, 1851–1904
 Rural Dean of Saffron Walden, 1873–79
 Honorary Canon of St Albans Abbey, 1873–1904

He was described as "a good but dull man lacking intellectual powers".

He succeeded his brother Charles Neville, 5th Baron Braybrooke as the 6th Baron in 1902, and died on 12 January 1904 at the Master's Lodge at Magdalene College.

References

1827 births
1904 deaths
People educated at Eton College
Alumni of Magdalene College, Cambridge
Fellows of Magdalene College, Cambridge
Masters of Magdalene College, Cambridge
6
19th-century English Anglican priests